Helional (from heliotropin, from which is it commonly derived) is a chemical compound used as a perfume in soap and laundry detergent. Chemically it is an aldehyde with a hydrocinnamaldehyde motif; a structural element which is present in a number of other important commercial fragrances and odorants.

Synthesis
Several synthetic routes exist but the most common is a crossed-aldol condensation between piperonal (heliotropin) and propanal followed by selective hydrogenation of the intermediate alkene. This produces a racemic product.

See also
Cyclamen aldehyde
Lilial
Hexyl cinnamaldehyde

References

Benzodioxoles
Aldehydes
Perfume ingredients